Paul Marcel Berenger (born 26 March 1991), is a Zimbabwe-born Australian actor.

Personal life
Berenger was born on 26 March 1991 in Harare, Zimbabwe. However, he was forced to relocate to Australia under adverse geographical circumstances.

Career
At the age of 11, he had the passion i acting after seeing his older brother on stage in a primary school play. However, he started acting while moving to Australia. Berenger made his first cinema appearance with 2008 film Two Fists, One Heart. Later he has acted in several short films such as Brittany, Die Krankenhaus, The Army Within and Impasse.

Filmography

References

External links
 
 Paul Berenger: Actor, Extra, Model

Living people
21st-century Zimbabwean male actors
1979 births
Zimbabwean male film actors